The Lullaby is a 1924 American silent drama film directed by Chester Bennett and starring Jane Novak, Robert Anderson, and Fred Malatesta. The story recounts a man being hung and his pregnant wife sent to prison.

Plot
As described in a film magazine review, newly wed Felipa is attacked by her husband Tony's friend Pietro. Tony intervenes and Pietro is killed. As a result, Tony is hanged for the killing and his pregnant wife is sentenced to imprisonment. A baby is born in prison, taken from its mother at the age of three, and adopted by the judge from the murder case, who is now the governor. After serving her twenty year sentence, Filipa is released. For the sake of her child Antoinette, she resigns all legal claims to her in favor of the guardians who raised the child.

Cast

References

Bibliography
 Munden, Kenneth White. The American Film Institute Catalog of Motion Pictures Produced in the United States, Part 1. University of California Press, 1997.

External links
 

1924 films
1924 drama films
1920s English-language films
1920s pregnancy films
American silent feature films
Silent American drama films
American black-and-white films
Films directed by Chester Bennett
Film Booking Offices of America films
1920s American films
Films about adoption